Wheal may refer to:

 Wheals, a type of skin lesion
 Brad Wheal (born 1996), British cricketer
 Donald James Wheal (1931–2008), British British television writer, novelist and non-fiction writer
 David John Wheal, Australian businessman
 "The Wheal", a 1987 song by Coil

See also
 
 Mining in Cornwall and Devon, includes mines whose names include Wheal
 Wheel (disambiguation)